The first election to Ceredigion District Council was held in April 1973.  It was  followed by the 1976 election. On the same day there were elections to the other local authorities and community councils in Wales.

Results

Aberaeron (one seat)

Aberbanc (one seat)

Aberporth (one seat)

Aberystwyth Ward One (four seats)

Aberystwyth Ward Two (two seats)

Aberystwyth Ward Three (two seats)

Aeron (one seat)

Borth (one seat)

Bow Street (one seat)
This ward was also known as Llangorwen.

Cardigan (three seats)

Cwmrheidol and Devils' Bridge (one seat)

Faenor Upper (one seat)

Felinfach (one seat)

Lampeter (two seats)

Llanarth (one seat)

Llanbadarn Fawr (one seat)

Llandygwydd (one seat)

Llandysul North (one seat)

Llandysul South (one seat)

Llanfair and Llanwnen (one seat)

Llanfarian (one seat)
This ward was also known as Llanychaiarn.

Llanfihangel and Llanilar (one seat)

Llangeitho and Caron Isclawdd (one seat)
This ward was also known as Llanbadarn Odwyn.

Llangoedmor (one seat)

Llangrannog and Penbryn (one seat)

Llanilar and Llanrhystud (one seat)

Llanllwchaiarn and Llandysiliogogo (one seat)

Llansantffraid and Cilcennin (one seat)

Llanwenog (one seat)

Lledrod, Strata Florida and Ysbyty Ystwyth (one seat)
This ward was also known as Ystwyth.

Nantcwnlle, Llanddewi Brefi and Llangeitho (one seat)
This ward was also known as Gartheli.

New Quay (one seat)

Taliesin and Talybont (one seat)
This ward was also known as Llancynfelyn

Trefeurig and Goginan (one seat)
This ward was also known as Melindwr.

Troedyraur (one seat)

References

1973
1973 Welsh local elections
20th century in Ceredigion